Sonnet 90 is one of 154 sonnets written by the English playwright and poet William Shakespeare. It is a member of the Fair Youth sequence, in which the poet expresses his love towards a young man.

Synopsis
The sonnet continues the themes of the breakdown of the relationship between the youth and the poet. The poet suggests that the youth should reject him now that everyone seems to be against him. The poet exhorts the youth not to wait to reject him until after these other, less important, sorrows have passed. At least if he is rejected now, his other problems will pale into insignificance.

Structure 
Sonnet 90 is an English or Shakespearean sonnet. The English sonnet has three quatrains, followed by a final rhyming couplet. It follows the typical rhyme scheme of the form, ABAB CDCD EFEF GG, and is composed in iambic pentameter, a type of poetic metre based on five pairs of metrically weak/strong syllabic positions. The 10th line exemplifies a regular iambic pentameter:

  ×  /  ×   /  ×   /     ×    /     ×     / 
When other petty griefs have done their spite, (90.10)

Lines 5 and 7 have a final extrametrical syllable or feminine ending. Line 7 may also be read as exhibiting another common metrical variation, the initial reversal:

 /    ×  ×  /  ×  /    ×  /  ×  / (×) 
Give not a windy night a rainy morrow, (90.7)
/ = ictus, a metrically strong syllabic position. × = nonictus. (×) = extrametrical syllable.

Initial reversals also occur in lines 3 and 6, and potentially 2. A potential mid-line reversal occurs in line 11 ("so shall").

Notes

References

British poems
Sonnets by William Shakespeare